Guilherme Muricy (born 1964) is a Brazilian invertebrate zoologist, and Professor of Invertebrate Zoology at the National Museum of Brazil. He is a specialist in sponges and has written over 100 papers on the chemistry, the taxonomy of sponges, and the descriptions of many new sponge species.

His zoological author abbreviation is Muricy.

Taxa named by Muricy
See Taxa named by Guilherme Muricy.

References

Brazilian zoologists
Living people
1964 births